John Potter (born January 24, 1990) is a former American football placekicker. The Buffalo Bills selected him in the seventh round, 251st overall, of the 2012 NFL Draft. He played college football at Western Michigan University.

College
Potter left Western Michigan as the all-time leader in career points (333), consecutive point after touchdowns (PATs) made in a season (57) and consecutive PATs made in a career (129). His 129 consecutive PATs is also a Mid-American Conference (MAC) record. Potter recorded 36 touchbacks his senior season which ranked third in the nation. Potter also holds the school record for tackles by a kicker (36).  In addition, he scored a rushing touchdown on a fake field goal, ran in a two-point conversion and recovered two fumbles on kickoff coverage.

Potter was named third-team All-MAC his junior and senior season. He was also named conference special teams player of the week four times. He was named the first-team Academic All-American his senior season and graduated summa cum laude.

Professional career

Buffalo Bills
Potter was selected in the seventh round, 251st overall, by the Buffalo Bills in the 2012 NFL Draft. He was the kickoff specialist for the first six weeks of the season, registering 13 touchbacks on 26 kickoffs. He was released on November 6, 2012.

Washington Redskins
Potter signed with the Washington Redskins on June 12, 2013. He was released on August 26, 2013. The Redskins re-signed him on September 14 after an injury to the incumbent kicker Kai Forbath. Potter made 3 of 4 Field Goals in 3 games with the Redskins. On October 1, 2013, he was released, along with Phillip Merling, in order to make room on the roster for the reinstatement of Rob Jackson and Jarvis Jenkins.

Detroit Lions
The Detroit Lions signed Potter to a futures contract at the conclusion of the 2013 season. He was released on May 12, 2014.

Miami Dolphins
Potter was signed by the Miami Dolphins after the team's first 2014 preseason game. Potter was 3 for 3 in field goals including kicks from 48 and 51 yards. The Dolphins waived an injured Potter on August 25, 2014.

References

External links
 Western Michigan Broncos bio

1990 births
Living people
American football placekickers
Buffalo Bills players
Miami Dolphins players
Players of American football from Michigan
Sportspeople from Kalamazoo, Michigan
Washington Redskins players
Western Michigan Broncos football players